Darragh Leader (born 22 May 1993) is a retired rugby player from Ireland. His primary position is at fullback, though he has also played on the wing. Leader plays for Connacht in the Pro14, having come through Connacht's academy.

Early life
Born in Galway, Leader grew up in Castlegar, just outside the city. He is a former pupil of St. Joseph's Patrician College, one of the city's secondary schools, and a studied at the local university NUI Galway, where he graduated with a Commerce degree. Leader comes from a strong rugby family, with his older brother, Tadhg, being a former member of the Connacht academy, while Greg, the eldest brother, played for the province at underage level. Their parents were also heavily involved in sport, with their mother, Breda, serving as secretary for Rowing Ireland and their father, Noel, played for and served as president of the Galwegians rugby club, where Leader first played the sport.

Career

Connacht
Leader signed to the Connacht academy ahead of the 2012–13 season.. While still a member of the province's academy, he made his debut for the senior side in the 2012–13 Pro12 against the previous season's champions Ospreys on 27 October 2012. Before becoming a regular for the senior side, Leader mostly played for the second tier development side, the Connacht Eagles. This included a game in the semi-professional British and Irish Cup away against Rotherham Titans in 2013, where he kicked a last minute penalty from 60 metres to win the game 27-25.

Leader made his first 2013–14 Pro12 appearance on 2 November 2013 against the Glasgow Warriors, which was his first game for the senior team in over a year, as well as his first game at the Sportsground. He started the match at outside centre, and played for the full 80 minutes. Leader made his first European appearance on 14 December 2013 at home to Toulouse in the 2013–14 Heineken Cup, coming on as a replacement. His first start in the competition came against Zebre on 11 January 2014 in a 20-3 win. Leader finished the season with 13 appearances in the league, seven of these coming as starts, and scored two tries. His first ever try for the province came in a derby with Ulster.

In April 2014, it was announced that Leader had signed a contract with Connacht. The one-year deal represents his first official contract as part of the senior team, and runs to the end of the 2014–15 season.

International
Internationally, Leader has represented Ireland at under-age level. He was a part of the Ireland under-20 squad that went to the 2013 IRB Junior World Championship, where Ireland finished as runners up in their pool to New Zealand. Following the play-off rounds, Ireland finished the tournament in eighth place overall.

In 2014, Leader was one of five uncapped players named in Joe Schmidt's 37-man  squad for the November internationals. He was selected as 24th man for one of the games

References

1993 births
Living people
Alumni of the University of Galway
Connacht Rugby players
Galwegians RFC players
Irish rugby union players
People educated at St Joseph's Patrician College
Rugby union fullbacks
Rugby union players from County Galway
Sportspeople from Galway (city)